"You Always Hurt the One You Love" is a pop standard, with words by Allan Roberts and music by Doris Fisher. First recorded by The Mills Brothers, whose recording reached the top of the Billboard charts in 1944, it was also a hit for Sammy Kaye (vocal by Billy Williams) in 1945.

It has been performed by many other artists over the years, including Moon Mullican with Cliff Bruner, Connie Francis (number 13 on the UK Singles Chart in 1959, where it had been released as a special "A" side to cater for huge demand for her product), Fats Domino, The Impressions, Molly Nilsson, George Maharis, Frankie Laine, Richard Chamberlain (as the B-side of his single "Rome Will Never Leave You"), Peggy Lee, Maureen Evans, Michael Bublé, Kay Starr, Hank Thompson, Ringo Starr (in his 1970 album Sentimental Journey), and Clarence "Frogman" Henry, whose version became a top 20 hit on the Billboard Hot 100 in 1961. It was also popular in a parody version by Spike Jones. The song was performed by Ryan Gosling and featured prominently in the 2010 film Blue Valentine.

A partial list of singers who have recorded this song
 
 The Mills Brothers, 1944 number 1
 Spike Jones (parody), 1945
 Eddy Arnold, 1953
 Fontaine Sisters 1956
 Connie Francis, 1958
 The Lennon Sisters, 1958
 Kay Starr, 1960
 Fats Domino, 1960
 Pat Boone, 1960
 Clarence "Frogman" Henry, 1961, Argo Records
 Ada Lee, 1961
 Brenda Lee, 1962
 Al Martino, 1963
 Paul Anka, 1963
 Hank Thompson, 1964
 Richard Chamberlain, 1964
 The Impressions, 1964
 The Ink Spots, 1964
 George Maharis, 1965
 Peggy Lee, 1965
 Ringo Starr, 1970
 Frankie Laine, 1968
 Ray Price, 1985
 Willie Nelson, 1993
 Michael Bublé, 2002
 Ryan Gosling, 2010

The Mills Brothers' version
The recording by The Mills Brothers was released by Decca Records as catalog number 18599. It first reached the Billboard Best Seller chart on June 22, 1944, and lasted 20 weeks on the chart, peaking at number one. The Mills Brothers version also reached number five on the Harlem Hit Parade.

The flip side, "Till Then", also charted in the top 10, making the record a two-sided hit.

It was heard twice in ''Angel'' episode "Rm w/a Vu" in two scenes: one where Maude haunts Cordelia and another in a flashback scene in Los Angeles, where Dennis is entombed in the wall of his apartment by the former, his mother, in 1946.

Spike Jones version
Spike Jones' parody of the song is essentially the straight song with most of the parody being in the way the song is presented, in three parts:
A slow, deliberate rendering of the first half of the song, with vocal by Carl Grayson, in a style imitating The Ink Spots.
A spoken rendering of the second half of the song, by Red Ingle, with elaborations ("honey child, honey doll, honey lamb, honey pie") in a style reminiscent of The Ink Spots's bass singer Orville "Hoppy" Jones.
A frantically paced reiteration of the full song, in "Dixieland" style, with vocal again by Carl Grayson, accompanied by shotguns and other typical Jonesian sound effects.

Harry Mills of the Mills Brothers reported not being bothered by the parody, since they were under the same management as Jones and were good friends.

Some artists have covered this version of the song (albeit fewer than have recorded the original standard). Those artists include:
Stanford Fleet Street Singers on their album 50-Minute Fun Break (1992)

References

1944 songs
1944 singles
1961 singles
Clarence "Frogman" Henry songs
Richard Chamberlain songs
Number-one singles in the United States
Songs written by Doris Fisher (songwriter)
Songs written by Allan Roberts (songwriter)
Argo Records singles